Jasen Ryan Rauch (born April 24, 1981) is an American musician, songwriter and record producer. He is the current lead guitarist of the rock band Breaking Benjamin and was the former lead guitarist of the Christian rock band Red. Rauch was also the producer for Korn guitarist Brian Welch's solo project, Love and Death, before becoming the band's bassist in 2020. According to Welch, Rauch "has a great track record for recording, producing, writing, and being in a band", and credits him as an inspiration for his returning to music. Before joining Breaking Benjamin in late 2014, Rauch also co-wrote several songs on their 2009 Dear Agony album, including "I Will Not Bow" and "Lights Out". Rauch is also a writer for Razor & Tie Music Publishing.

Rauch has also worked with acts such as Pillar, Kerrie Roberts, Stars Go Dim, Fireflight, 12 Stones, Spoken, The Wedding, and Disciple. Spoken frontman Matt Baird expressed Rauch as a "vital part in what 'Illusion' is and where Spoken is right now", crediting him as "an amazing producer." Rauch also worked with producer Rob Graves in scoring the film Into the Darkness.

Personal life 
Rauch is married to Heather and has two daughters with his former wife. He resides in Springfield, Tennessee. Rauch is a Christian. His second wife, Heather, delivered their first child stillborn in December 2016.

Discography 
With Breaking Benjamin
 Dear Agony  (2009)
 Dark Before Dawn (2015)
 Ember (2018)
 Aurora (2020)

With Love & Death
 Chemicals (EP)  (2012)
 Between Here & Lost  (2013)
 Perfectly Preserved (2021)

With Red
 End of Silence (2006)
 Innocence & Instinct (2009)
 Until We Have Faces  (2011)
 Release the Panic  (2013)

References

External links 

Breaking Benjamin members
Living people
American heavy metal guitarists
People from Springfield, Tennessee
1981 births
Guitarists from Tennessee
American male guitarists
Red (band) members